Fellowship of the Institute of Materials, Minerals and Mining (abbreviated as FIMMM) is an award granted to individuals that the Institute of Materials, Minerals and Mining (IOM3) judges to have made “significant contribution or established a record of achievement in the materials, minerals, mining”.

Applications
Applications for fellowships are open to both members and non-members of the IOM3.  Applications must be supported by two letters of recommendation from current fellows of the IOM3 and have known the applicant for a minimum of 2 years.

Examples of fellows include Harshad Bhadeshia, Rachel Thomson, Derek Fray, Robert Baker and Allan Matthews. Honorary fellows include Mark Miodownik and Sue Ion. Fellows are entitled to use the post-nominal letters FIMMM.

See also 

 :Category:Fellows of the Institute of Materials, Minerals and Mining

References

Fellows of learned societies of the United Kingdom
Academic awards